Sadio Demba is a Senegalese former football manager.

Career

In 2014, Demba became the first Senegalese to earn the UEFA Pro License. In 2016, he was appointed manager of Belgian third tier side White Star. In 2017, he was appointed manager of Tubize-Braine in the Belgian second tier. In 2018, Demba was appointed manager of Saudi Arabian top flight club Ohod Club. In 2018, he was appointed manager of Al-Orobah in the Saudi Arabian second tier.

References

External links
 

A.F.C. Tubize managers
Belgian First Division B managers
Expatriate football managers in Belgium
Expatriate football managers in Saudi Arabia
Expatriate footballers in Belgium
Ohod Club managers
Royal Antwerp F.C. managers
Saudi First Division League managers
Saudi Professional League managers
Senegalese football managers
Senegalese footballers
Year of birth missing (living people)
Living people